The United States District Court for the Northern District of Texas (in case citations, N.D. Tex.) is a United States district court. Its first judge, Andrew Phelps McCormick, was appointed to the court on April 10, 1879. The court convenes in Dallas, Texas with divisions in Fort Worth, Amarillo, Abilene, Lubbock, San Angelo, and Wichita Falls. It has jurisdiction over 100 counties in the northern and central parts of the U.S. state of Texas.

The United States Attorney's Office for the Northern District of Texas represents the United States in civil and criminal litigation in the court. , the United States Attorney is Leigha Simonton.

Appeals from this court are heard by the U.S. Court of Appeals for the Fifth Circuit, which includes Louisiana, Mississippi and Texas (except for patent claims and claims against the U.S. government under the Tucker Act, which are appealed to the Federal Circuit).

Jurisdiction 
The Northern District of Texas has seven court divisions, covering the following counties:

The Abilene Division, covering Callahan, Eastland, Fisher, Haskell, Howard, Jones, Mitchell, Nolan, Shackelford, Stephens, Stonewall, Taylor, and Throckmorton counties.

The Amarillo Division, covering Armstrong, Briscoe, Carson, Castro, Childress, Collingsworth, Dallam, Deaf Smith, Donley, Gray, Hall, Hansford, Hartley, Hemphill, Hutchinson, Lipscomb, Moore, Ochiltree, Oldham, Parmer, Potter, Randall, Roberts, Sherman, Swisher, and Wheeler counties.

The Dallas Division, covering Dallas, Ellis, Hunt, Johnson, Kaufman, Navarro, and Rockwall counties.

The Fort Worth Division, covering Comanche, Erath, Hood, Jack, Palo Pinto, Parker, Tarrant, and Wise counties.

The Lubbock Division, covering Bailey, Borden, Cochran, Crosby, Dawson, Dickens, Floyd, Gaines, Garza, Hale, Hockley, Kent, Lamb, Lubbock, Lynn, Motley, Scurry, Terry, and Yoakum counties.

The San Angelo Division, covering Brown, Coke, Coleman, Concho, Crockett, Glasscock, Irion, Menard, Mills, Reagan, Runnels, Schleicher, Sterling, Sutton, and Tom Green counties.

The Wichita Falls Division, covering Archer, Baylor, Clay, Cottle, Foard, Hardeman, King, Knox, Montague, Wichita, Wilbarger, and Young counties.

History 
The first federal judge in Texas was John C. Watrous, who was appointed on May 26, 1846, and had previously served as Attorney General of the Republic of Texas.  He was assigned to hold court in Galveston, at the time, the largest city in the state.  As seat of the United States District Court for the District of Texas, the Galveston court had jurisdiction over the whole state.  On February 21, 1857, the state was divided into two districts, Eastern and Western, with Judge Watrous continuing in the Eastern district. Judge Watrous and Judge Thomas Howard DuVal, of the Western District of Texas, left the state on the secession of Texas from the Union, the only two United States judges not to resign their posts in states that seceded. When Texas was restored to the Union, Watrous and DuVal resumed their duties and served until 1870.

In 1879, Texas was further subdivided with the creation of the United States District Court for the Northern District of Texas, using territory taken from both the Eastern and Western districts.

Current judges 
:

Former judges

Chief judges

Succession of seats

See also 
 Courts of Texas
 List of current United States district judges
 List of United States federal courthouses in Texas

Notes

External links 
 Official site

Texas, Northern District
Texas law
Dallas
Fort Worth, Texas
Amarillo, Texas
Abilene, Texas
Lubbock, Texas
San Angelo, Texas
Wichita Falls, Texas
Courthouses in Texas
1879 establishments in Texas
Courts and tribunals established in 1879